The Grammy Award for Best Orchestral Performance has been awarded since 1959.  There have been several minor changes to the name of the award over this time:

From 1959 to 1964 it was awarded as Best Classical Performance - Orchestra  
In 1965 it was Best Performance - Orchestra
From 1966 to 1975 it returned to Best Classical Performance - Orchestra''
From 1977 to 1978 it was awarded as Best Classical Orchestral PerformanceFrom  1980 to 1981 it was awarded as Best Classical Orchestral RecordingIn 1983 it was awarded as Best Orchestral Performance In 1984 it was awarded as Best Orchestral Recording  
From 1985 to 1987 it returned to being called Best Classical Orchestral Recording  
From 1988 to 1989 it was once again called Best Orchestral RecordingFrom 1990 to the present it has returned to being called Best Orchestral Performance'''  
Years reflect the year in which the Grammy Awards were presented, for works released in the previous year.

Until 1989, the Grammy Award went to the conductor only, but since then, the Orchestra has also been given an award (although the orchestras are not always mentioned as a nominee).

Recipients

Multiple Wins and Nominations

The following individuals received two or more Best Orchestral Performance awards:

The following individuals received four or more Best Orchestral Performance nominations:

References

Grammy Awards for classical music
Orchestral music
Awards established in 1959